60 Vayadu Maaniram also known as Arubathu Vayadu Maaniram ( 60 years old, wheatish complexion) is a 2018 Indian Tamil-language drama film written and directed by Radha Mohan. This movie is the remake of 2016 Kannada box office hit film Godhi Banna Sadharana Mykattu. The film stars Prakash Raj, Vikram Prabhu, Samuthirakani and Indhuja Ravichandran in main lead roles. This film is produced by popular producer and distributor Kalaipuli S. Thanu under his production company V Creations.

The film's score and soundtrack are scored by Ilaiyaraaja. The film's cinematography is handled by Manush Nandan while editing is handled by T.S.Jay. The art direction of the film is handled by K. Kathir.

Plot
Govindarajan (Prakash Raj), a 60-year-old man, suffers from Alzheimer's disease. One day, he suddenly goes missing. His son Shiva (Vikram Prabhu), who is worried by his father's disappearance, embarks on a search with a female doctor named Archana (Indhuja Ravichandran). Govindarajan gets entangled with Ranga (Samuthirakani), a killer who has committed a murder. The rest of the film involves whether Shiva finds his father or not.

Cast 

 Prakash Raj as Govindarajan
 Vikram Prabhu as Shiva Govindarajan
 Samuthirakani as Ranga
 Indhuja Ravichandran as Dr. Archana
 Bharath Reddy as ACP Badrinath (Badri)
 Elango Kumaravel as Rajappan
 Jangiri Madhumitha as Janaki Rajappan (Jaanu)
 Mohan Raman as Balachandran (Balu)
 Meena Vemuri as Archana's mother
 Daddy Saravanan as Inspector S. Thangaraj
 Raghavan as S.I. Raghunath
 Radha Ramakrishnan as Maria
 Ramesh V as Maria's husband Johnny
 Sarath as Kaasi
 Aroul D. Shankar as Guna
 Anu Krishna as Madhavi

Production 
Prakash Raj purchased the rights to remake the 2016 Kannada box office hit film Godhi Banna Sadharana Mykattu in Tamil, Telugu. and Hindi. The production venture of the film commenced in late 2016 which also marked the first remake film in Radha Mohan's filmography.

The official trailer of the film was released on 14 August 2018 and received positive reviews from the audience.

Release
After 5 Years Later, The Satellite Rights Of The Film was sold to Colors Tamil. This Movie will be premiere in Feb 5 2023 at 2p.m

Soundtrack 

The background music for the film was composed by Ilaiyaraaja, while the lyrics were penned by Pa. Vijay, Pazhani Bharathi and Vivek.

Reception
Times of India wrote "The movie appeals to those who haven't watched the original version or love watching stories on beautiful bonding". Firstpost wrote "On the whole 60 Vayathu Maaniram is refreshingly fresh and likeable for its characters." Behindwoods wrote "With interesting writing for Samuthirakani's portions and an engaging screenplay, 60 Vayadu Maaniram could have looked a lot more complete." India Today called it "Average drama with overdose of emotions". Deccan Chronicle wrote it "is a neatly self-contained film that achieves what it set out to through delicate acting, nuanced cinematography, and serene music".

References

External links 

 

2010s Tamil-language films
Indian films about Alzheimer's disease
Films scored by Ilaiyaraaja
Tamil remakes of Kannada films
Indian drama films
2018 drama films
Films directed by Radha Mohan